Šampita (Cyrillic: Шампита) is a whipped meringue dessert with egg yolk crust, originating in the Balkans.

Gallery

See also
 Cremeschnitte

External links
 Serbian meringue slice

Cakes
Desserts
Balkan cuisine
Bosnia and Herzegovina cuisine
Croatian desserts
Serbian cuisine
Meringue desserts